Dichromodes longidens is a moth of the family Geometridae. It is known from Australia.

References

Oenochrominae
Moths described in 1910